John C. Elliott (January 30, 1919 – April 13, 2001) was an American politician appointed as the governor of American Samoa. Elliott was born on January 30, 1919, in Los Angeles, California. He died on April 13, 2001, in San Marino, California. He is buried at the San Gabriel Cemetery in San Gabriel, California. He took office on July 16, 1952, and left on November 23, 1952, leaving for personal reasons, and is the youngest man to ever hold the office at 33 years of age. Prior to his appointment, Elliott had served as the assistant to Governor Phelps Phelps and Secretary of American Samoa.

References

1919 births
2001 deaths
Governors of American Samoa
Politicians from Los Angeles
California Democrats
American Samoa Democrats
Burials in Los Angeles County, California
20th-century American politicians